Vitol SA v. Norelf Ltd, The Santa Clara [1996] A.C. 800; [1996] 3 W.L.R. 105; [1996] 3 All E.R. 193, is an English contract law case about the effect of non-performance in accepting a contracting partner's repudiatory breach of contract.

Facts
Norelf Ltd contracted to sell a cargo of propane to Vitol SA in 1991. The propane market had been very volatile. The cargo was being shipped (on the Santa Clara) from Houston, U.S. It was meant to leave before March 7. On March 8, while it was still being loaded, Vitol sent a telex to Norelf saying it did not wish the contract to continue because it was not going to arrive on time (i.e. Vitol repudiated the contract). The ship was loaded, and it sailed on March 9. The price of the cargo fell. Neither side did anything further to perform the contract. Norelf sold the cargo at a loss, and then claimed damages ($950,000) from Vitol for breach of contract.

The arbitrator held that Vitol's telex was an anticipatory breach of contract, but Norelf's failure to take further steps to perform the contract was sufficient communication to Vitol that they had accepted the repudiation. Vitol's appeal was dismissed in the High Court by Phillips J. But it succeeded in the Court of Appeal, who held that a mere failure to perform contractual obligations could not constitute acceptance of the repudiation. Norelf appealed to the House of Lords.

Judgment
Lord Steyn (with whom Lord Mackay of Clashfern, L.C., Lord Griffiths, Lord Nolan and Lord Hoffmann concurred) allowed Norelf's appeal.

In some circumstances an innocent party may simply fail to perform his obligations under a repudiated contract, and that was enough to accept the repudiation. So communication (orally or written) was not always necessary. The question was whether the innocent party's conduct did convey, unequivocally, that he was treating the contract as repudiated. A failure could be unequivocal.

Because Norelf was the respondent, in a defensive position, the Court of Appeal had been wrong to say that Norelf required to seek a certificate under the Arbitration Act 1979, s.1(7) before being allowed to argue that the award was sustainable on alternative grounds.

Lord Steyn read the following.

See also
English contract law

Notes

English termination case law
House of Lords cases
1996 in case law
1996 in British law